The President (Persian: پرزیدنت) is a film by Iranian director Mohsen Makhmalbaf following the themes of his previous film The Gardener. The President had its world premiere at Venice Film Festival in 2014, opening the festival together with Birdman.

Plot
A revolution is happening in a country with a dictatorial president. The president sends his family abroad but his grandson wants to stay with his grandfather. In order to save their lives they run away and the president uses a wig and a guitar to disguise himself as a gypsy. They want to reach the sea so they can go to another country by boat. They must experience poverty and hunger during their journey, and see the effects of the dictatorship on the country.

The inspiration for the film came when Makhmalbaf visited the Darul Aman Palace in Kabul. The Arab Spring revolutions were also inspirations.

Festivals
 Venice International Film Festival, Italy, 2014  (Opening film)
 Busan International Film Festival, South Korea, 2014
 Beirut International Film Festival, Lebanon, 2014
 Chicago International Film Festival, USA, 2014
 London Film Festival, United Kingdom, 2014
 Warsaw International Film Festival, Poland, 2014
 Tokyo FILMeX International Film Festival, Japan, 2014
 International Film Festival Of India ( Goa), India, 2014  (Opening film)
 Tbilisi International Film Festival, Georgia, 2014 (Opening film)
 Carthage International Film Festival, Tunnis, 2014
 Tertio Millennio Film Festival, Italy, 2014 (Opening film)
 Inter National Film Festival of India (Kerala) 2014

Awards
 Golden Hugo for the best film from Chicago International Film Festival, United States, 2014
 Audience Award for the Best Film from the 15th TOKYO FILMeX International Film Festival, Japan, 2014
 Société Générale Award for Best Feature Film by the audience vote from the 14th Beirut International Film Festival, Lebanon, 2014

References

External links
 
 
 
 THE GUARDIAN - Film Review
 SCREEN DAILY- The President

2014 films
Films directed by Mohsen Makhmalbaf